Future Group is an Indian conglomerate, founded by Kishore Biyani and based in Mumbai. The company is known in Indian retail and fashion sectors, operating supermarket chains Big Bazaar and Food Bazaar, lifestyle stores Brand Factory and Central, integrated foods and FMCG manufacturing sectors. Future Retail Limited and Future Lifestyle Fashions Limited are two operating companies whose assets are among the top retail companies listed in BSE, with market capitalization among the highest on the National Stock Exchange of India.

Nearly all of its businesses are managed through sector-focused operating companies.

The group promotes its fashion and sports brands Indigo Nation, Spalding, Lombard, and Bare, and FMCG brands Tasty Treat, Fresh & Pure, Clean Mate, Ektaa, Premium Harvest, Sach. Other operating companies address internal financial matters and consulting. The company is attempting to reduce debt to avoid insolvency, according to industry sources.

History 
To do so, the Pantaloons fashion segment was demerged from Pantaloons Retail India Ltd, which was then merged into subsidiary Future Value Retail Ltd and later renamed Future Retail Ltd.

On 21 November 2014, Future Consumer Enterprises Limited acquired 98% of Nilgris from Actis Capital and other promoters. With that, Nilgiris is a wholly-owned subsidiary of Future Consumer Enterprises Limited (FCEL).

In August 2019, Amazon acquired a 49% stake in Future Coupons, and indirectly obtained a 3.5% minority stake in Future Retail, ahead of an option to buy all or part of the promoters' holding in the company.

In August 2020, it was announced that Reliance Retail had reached an agreement with Future Group to acquire the latter's retail and wholesale businesses and its logistics and warehousing businesses for $3.4 billion. 

The merger between Reliance Retail and Future Group was halted in October 2020, after Amazon filed a plea in the High Court for enforcement of EA awarded by the Singapore International Arbitration Center. In August 2021, the Supreme Court of India upheld Amazon's plea to restrain the merger. In December 2021, the CCI withdrew its approval for Amazon's acquisition of a minority stake in Future Coupons, stating that Amazon had misled the regulator about the purpose of its investment in the Future Group company.

Operations and subsidiaries

Retail
 Future Retail Ltd
 Future Lifestyle Fashion Ltd 
 Future Consumer Limited
 Future Enterprises Limited
 Swathi Tiffin Shop
 Foodhall

Financial services
 Future Capital Holdings (for internal financial services)
 Future Generali India Life Insurance 
 Future Generali General Insurance
 Future Ventures

Other services
 Future Innoversity
 Future Supply Chains
 Future Brands

Brands

Future Retail Ltd.

 HomeTown, furniture retailer
 Koryo (Private Label)
 Food Bazaar
 Fashion at Big Bazaar (FBB)
 Aadhaar Wholesale
 E Zone
 Foodhall (Premium Stores)
 Easyday
Big Bazaar
Nilgiris 1905
Heritage Fresh
HyperCity

Future Lifestyle Fashion Ltd 
 Central
 Brand Factory
 Planet Sports
 I AM in

Fashion and lifestyle

 Indigo Nation
 Scullers
 John Millers
 All
 Rig
 Coverstory
 SPUNK
 DJ&C
 Buffalo
 Hey
 Bare
 Clarks
 Holii
 UMM
 Urban Yoga
 Jealous 21

Integrated foods and FMCG  

 Nilgiris
 Tasty Treat
 Fresh & Pure
 Ektaa
 Premium Harvest
 Mera Swad
 Pratha
 Punya
 Sach
 Kosh
 Sunkist
 Kara
 TS
 Clean mate
 Care mate
 Swiss tempelle
 Baker street
 Golden Harvest
 Prim
 Desi Atta Company
 Sangi's Kitchen
Voom
Dreamery
Sensible Portions
MYSST
Puretta
Veg Affaire
Terra
Mother Earth
Karmiq

Joint ventures and associate companies

FabFurnish 
FabFurnish was launched as an online retailer of furniture, décor, and home appliances in March 2012 by Vikram Chopra,[1] Mehul Agrawal, and Vaibhav Aggarwal.[2] The company was headquartered in Gurgaon, NCR.

In July 2015, the brand announced a strategic restructuring, introducing Ashish Garg and Ankita Dabas as the new leaders. In April 2016, FabFurnish became a Future Group company.[3][4] On 13 April 2017, the Times of India reported that Future Group was likely to close FabFurnish.[5]

Generali Group 
Generali is an Italian insurance company, operating in India through a joint venture with Future Group under the brand name Future Generali Insurance. Future Generali operates in India via two Generali India Life Insurance Co. Ltd. (Life Insurance) and Generali India Insurance Co. Ltd. (Non-Life Insurance).[Primary 1]

Staples Inc 
Staples Inc., a United States-based office supply retailer, has a presence in over nine cities in India under a joint venture with Future Group.[Primary 2][7] As of April 2013, Future Group had a 60% stake in the partnership.[8]

Skechers 
Skechers entered India through a JV with Future Group in 2012. Skechers ended the joint venture in February 2019 by buying 49% them out.[9]

Celio 
French fashion Celio entered India in 2008 through a 50:50 joint venture with Future Group's then retail hand, Pantaloons Retail India Ltd (now Future Retail Ltd).[10] In November 2013, Celio hiked its stake in the joint venture to 65%.[11]

Clark 
C&J Clark International Ltd. is a UK-based footwear and accessories retailer. Future Group entered into a 50:50 joint venture to form 'Clarks Future Footwear Ltd'. The JV launched its first (1,600 sq ft.) stand-alone store in Connaught Place, Delhi on 19 April 2011.[12]

See also
 Online shopping
 Ecommerce in India

References

Primary sources

External links
 

Companies based in Mumbai
Retail companies of India
Online retailers of India
Retail companies established in 2013
2013 establishments in Maharashtra
Indian companies established in 2013
Future Group